Marie Schlei (26 November 1919 – 21 May 1983) was a German politician and a member of Social Democratic Party (SPD). She served as minister of economic cooperation from 1976 to 1978, being the first female head of the ministry.

Biography
Schlei was born on 26 November 1919 in Reetz, Pommern. She was a member of SPD and was the parliamentary state secretary in the premier's office from 1974 to 1976. She was appointed minister of economic cooperation to the cabinet led by Prime Minister Helmut Schmidt on 15 December 1976, replacing Egon Bahr in the post. Her appointment was not welcomed by the German media due to being a woman. On 16 February 1978, she was replaced by Rainer Offergeld in the post.

She died on 21 May 1983 in Berlin.

Legacy
In 1984, the Marie Schlei Association was founded in Hamburg for her memory to help women in Africa, Asia and Latin America. The association develops projects to this end.

References

External links

20th-century German women politicians
1919 births
1983 deaths
Economic Cooperation ministers of Germany
Female members of the Bundestag
Members of the Bundestag for Berlin
Members of the Bundestag 1980–1983
Members of the Bundestag 1976–1980
Members of the Bundestag 1972–1976
Members of the Bundestag 1969–1972
Members of the Bundestag for the Social Democratic Party of Germany
People from Choszczno County
People from the Province of Brandenburg
Women federal government ministers of Germany